Lookout is an unincorporated community and  coal town located in Pike County, Kentucky, United States. It was also known as the Marrowbone Coal Mine. Its post office closed in January 2011

References

Unincorporated communities in Pike County, Kentucky
Unincorporated communities in Kentucky
Coal towns in Kentucky